Amana ('Covenant') is an Israeli settlement movement formed by Gush Emunim in 1976. Its primary goal was "developing communities in Judea, Samaria, the Golan Heights, the Galilee, the Negev and Gush Katif." The initial communities it developed were Ofra, Mevo Modi'in, Kedumim, and Ma'aleh Adumim. Settlements developed in the West Bank, including East Jerusalem, are illegal under international law.

It became a registered association in 1978. It was also recognized by the World Zionist Organization. Over time, it became nearly independent of Gush Emunim.

An investigation by the Israeli police into 15 land deals conducted by the Amana subsidiary Al Watan concluded early in 2016 that 14 of the transactions were fraudulent. One method used involved giving a suitcase full of cash to a fake Palestinian owner and taking it back afterwards. Al Watan denied the charges.

References

External links
Official website 

Religious Zionist organizations
Israeli settlement
Settlement movements in Israel
1976 establishments in Israel